Asham Wood is a  biological Site of Special Scientific Interest east of Downhead and south of Leigh-on-Mendip in the Mendip Hills, Somerset, notified in 1963.

Asham Wood is the largest and most diverse of the ancient semi-natural woods in the Mendips. It has a permanent stream that runs through it feeding Chantry Pond to the east of the wood. It has been the subject of controversy and attempts to protect the environment from increased quarrying activity in the area.

The wood occupies 2 deep valleys and the intervening plateau. Most of the underlying
rocks are calcareous Carboniferous Limestone and Shales, but Devonian Portishead Beds
outcrop along the northern valley. There are a range of unusual flora and fauna.

At Asham Wood near Frome coppicing and 50 dormouse boxes have been introduced in order to encourage nesting. The boxes are monitored and dormice numbers are recorded.

References 

Mendip Hills
Sites of Special Scientific Interest in Somerset
Sites of Special Scientific Interest notified in 1963
Woodland Sites of Special Scientific Interest
Forests and woodlands of Somerset